Wanda dos Santos (born June 1, 1932 in São Paulo) is a retired female hurdler from Brazil, who represented her native country at two Summer Olympics, starting in 1952. She won a total number of four individual medals at the Pan American Games during her career.

Wanda, 76 years old, today's Athlete of the SPFC and veteran competitions, in addition to promoting social and sporting events for seniors and also teaching in the elementary school for children of College St. Helena in the village Gumercindo.

Wanda had to overcome two major barriers, In addition to the sportsbook. As a black woman suffered several prejudices, Especially in Summer Olympics in 1952 where the other contestants, even cordial, they refused to stay close to or touching the Brazilian athlete.

References

 sports-reference

1932 births
Living people
Brazilian female hurdlers
Brazilian female long jumpers
Athletes (track and field) at the 1951 Pan American Games
Athletes (track and field) at the 1955 Pan American Games
Athletes (track and field) at the 1959 Pan American Games
Athletes (track and field) at the 1963 Pan American Games
Athletes (track and field) at the 1952 Summer Olympics
Athletes (track and field) at the 1960 Summer Olympics
Olympic athletes of Brazil
Athletes from São Paulo
Pan American Games silver medalists for Brazil
Pan American Games bronze medalists for Brazil
Pan American Games medalists in athletics (track and field)
Medalists at the 1951 Pan American Games
Medalists at the 1955 Pan American Games
Medalists at the 1959 Pan American Games
Medalists at the 1963 Pan American Games